Aditya Kapadia (born 14 November 1986) is an Indian film and television actor. He was last seen in  Code Red on Colors TV.

Early life
Aditya Kapadia is a Gujarati. born and brought in Mumbai. He has acted in both Hindi and Gujrati films.

Personal life
Aditya got engaged to his co-star Tanvi Thakkar from Ek Doosre Se Karte Hain Pyaar Hum on 24 December 2013. The two tied the knot on 16 February 2021, in a simple court marriage.

Career
Aditya made his television debut with Idhar Udhar and Just Mohabbat as a child artist. After that he also played as a child in the Bollywood film Jaanwar. He did serials like Shaka Laka Boom Boom as Jhumru, Ek Doosre Se Karte Hain Pyaar Hum as Shashwat Nikhilesh Majumdar and Cambala Investigation Agency as Ishaan Mehra. He also played a role in Adaalat as Mukul Shrivastav. He did Bade Acche Lagte Hain as Khush Siddhant Kapoor/Khush Ram Kapoor, but was replaced by Ankit Narang.

Filmography

Television

Films
Jaanwar as Raju
Hari Puttar: A Comedy of Terrors as Rocky A. Dhoonca 
Ekkees Toppon Ki Salaami as young Purushotam Narayan Joshi
Sons of Ram as voice of Luv
Bas Ek Chance

References

External links
 
 

1986 births
Living people
Indian male film actors
Indian male television actors
Indian television male child actors
Gujarati people